Alberto Loddo (born 5 January 1979, in Cagliari) is an Italian former professional road bicycle racer.

Palmares

2001
1st Trofeo Franco Balestra
1st Gran Premio della Liberazione
2002
1st Stage 4 Tour of Qatar
2003
1st  Overall Tour of Qatar
1st  Points classification
1st  Young rider classification
1st Stage 1
1st Stage 2 Volta ao Algarve
2004
4th Wachovia Classic
2006
Vuelta Ciclista Por Un Chile Lider
1st Points classification
1st Stages 4, 7, 8a & 10
Circuit Cycliste de la Sarthe
1st  Points classification
1st Stage 3
1st Stage 4 Vuelta al Táchira 
2007
Tour de Langkawi
1st  Points classification
1st Stages 1, 4, 5, 6 & 10
1st Stage 1 Vuelta al Táchira
1st Stage 1 Vuelta Ciclista a la Rioja
1st Stage 2 Vuelta a Asturias
2008
1st Stage 5 Tour de Langkawi
1st Stage 1 Settimana Ciclista Lombarda (TTT)
8th Overall Tour of Qatar
1st Stage 4
2009
Vuelta a Venezuela
1st Stages 1 & 2
2010
Tour de San Luis
1st Stages 3 & 7
1st Stage 5 Giro di Sardegna

External links

Italian male cyclists
1979 births
Living people
Vuelta a Venezuela stage winners
Sportspeople from Cagliari
Mediterranean Games silver medalists for Italy
Mediterranean Games medalists in cycling
Competitors at the 2001 Mediterranean Games
Cyclists from Sardinia